Serbian League North was one of the sections of the Serbian League, serving as the third level football league in FR Yugoslavia between 1992 and 1995. It was subsequently split into two separate sections: Serbian League Belgrade and Serbian League Vojvodina.

Seasons

References

External links
 Football Association of Serbia

Defunct football leagues in Serbia
North